What's Another Year is the second studio album by Irish singer Johnny Logan. The album includes his 1980 Eurovision Song Contest winning song "What's Another Year".

The album was released internationally under the title The Johnny Logan Album in October 1980.

Track listing
LP/Cassette

Charts

References

Johnny Logan (singer) albums
1980 albums